Polymastia crocea is a species of sea sponge belonging to the family Polymastiidae. It is found in subtidal habitats below 6 m depth in the far north of the North Island of New Zealand.

This is a globular sponge up to 4 cm across or an encrusting sponge up to 7 cm across. This soft-textured sponge is very bright yellow outside and in with the surface covered in small papillae, some with pores, some without. This sponge is frequently infested with the parasitic amphipod Polycheria antarctica. At least three species of symbiont foraminifera are found within this sponge.

References
 

Sponges of New Zealand
Animals described in 1997
Hadromerida
Taxa named by Michelle Kelly (marine scientist)
Taxa named by Patricia Bergquist